The 1908–09 Northern Football League season was the twentieth in the history of the Northern Football League, a football competition in Northern England.

A Championship Play-Off between Bishop Auckland and South Bank, who finished the season level on points, was played on 27 November 1909 at the home ground of Darlington St Augustine's. Bishop Auckland were declared League Champions after a 4–2 victory.

Clubs

The league featured 10 clubs which competed in the last season, along with two new clubs: 
 West Auckland
 York City

League table

Championship match
27 November 1909: Bishop Auckland 4–2 South Bank

References

1908-09
1908–09 in English association football leagues